Rana Parshad aka Rana Patta was 18th king of Amarkot (Umerkot) (1530/1556). He gave refuge to Mughal king Humayun when he was defeated by Sher Shah Suri and nobody was offering him refuge because every kingdom was frightened of Sher Shah Suri.

Personal life 
Rana Parshad Singh was grandson of Rani Champa and son of Rana Ganga. He had a son named Rana Chandersen Sodha.

In popular culture 
It is said that when Akbar become the king of Delhi, he banned revenue taxes in the areas of Tharparkar and Amarkot. The famous poet of Sindh Shah Abdul Latif Bhittai has said in his Sindhi poetry in Shah Jo Risalo "Nika Jhal nika jad nika raher deh mein" means that in kingdom of Rana there is no revenue or governmental tax, everybody lives prosperous life.

See also 
Rana Hamir Singh
Rana Chandra Singh
Rana Ratan Singh
Kertee
Amarkot

References 

Thari people
1540 births
Year of death unknown